Mount Alexander is a mountain with several summits, the highest 595 m, forming the rocky peninsula separating Gibson and Haddon Bays, on the south side of Joinville Island in Antarctica. The cliff marking the extremity of the peninsula was discovered and named Cape Alexander on 8 January 1893 by Thomas Robertson, master of the ship Active, one of the Dundee whalers. The name was amended to Mount Alexander by the United Kingdom Antarctic Place-Names Committee (UK-APC) in 1956 following a survey by the Falkland Islands Dependencies Survey (FIDS) in 1953–54, the mountain summits of the peninsula being considered more suitable to name.

Alexander, Mount
Landforms of the Joinville Island group